Mathar Ramakrishnan Gopakumar (born 24 September 1951) is an Indian film, television and theatre actor from Kerala. He began his acting career through Malayalam stage plays and later in tele-films and television serials and into films. In his career spanning over four decades, Gopakumar has acted in a wide variety of roles and has worked in both art house and mainstream films. He is mainly noted for his role as Thommi in the 1994 movie Vidheyan.

He has won two Kerala State Film Awards and five Kerala State Television Awards for acting.

Early life
M. R. Gopakumar was born on 24 September 1951 in Thiruvattar, then in Travancore Cochin, now in Kanyakumari district of Tamil Nadu, as the elder son of N. Ramakrishnan Nair, who a school teacher in Thiruvattar High School, and B. Kamalabai Amma. Gopakumar did his primary school education in Thiruvattar Lower Primary School and completed his high school education from Thiruvattar High School. His did his pre-university course at Christian College, Marthandam and joined Pioneer Kumaraswamy College, Nagercoil and graduated with a Bachelor of Commerce degree. He later joined for post-graduation Master of Commerce at Mar Ivanios College, Thiruvananthapuram. He migrated to Thiruvananthapuram when he joined Mar Ivanios college.

After earning his master's degree, Gopakumar joined Indian government service in 1973 as an auditor with P&T Audit under Comptroller and Auditor General of India. Post bifurcation of this department, Gopakumar moved into the Postal Accounts Department under Government of India. He retired from Postal Accounts as an Assistant Accounts Officer in September 2011.

Career

Stage plays
M. R. Gopakumar started his acting career as an amateur theatre actor in 1974 in G. Sankara Pillai's drama Rakshapurushan. The play was staged by the recreation club members of P&T Audit. This helped Gopakumar identify his passion for acting and he found himself being a part of five more plays staged by the club. Towards the late 1970s, a few young aspiring artists in Thiruvananthapuram came together to form an amateur drama troupe named Natyagruham. Gopakumar was one of the founding members of Natyagruham. The troupe that was headed by Narendra Prasad soon became very popular in Thiruvananthapuram. The association with like-minded artists in Natyagruham helped Gopakumar polish his acting skills. During the next 15 years with the troupe, he associated himself with several stage plays that won the accolades of many art-lovers across Kerala.

Television
In 1986, Doordarshan started telecasting tele-films in Malayalam-language under their own production. Kunjayyappan was one of the first Malayalam tele-films produced and telecasted by Doordarshan. Gopakumar played the title role. In 1988, Doordarshan aired a 13-episode television serial Mandan Kunchu. Gopakumar played an important role alongside Nedumudi Venu and Kaviyoor Ponnamma. Gopakumar's professional acting career took off from there. Since then, he has acted in around 100 serials and tele-films.

Feature films
Gopakumar's first feature film appearance was in the 1989 movie Mathilukal directed by Adoor Gopalakrishnan. The film wan an adaptation of Vaikom Muhammad Basheer's novel of the same name. Gopakumar played the role of a random prison inmate who explains the story of a hole on the prison wall to his fellow inmate, the lead character, Basheer. His role in Mathilukal was not significant enough to be noticed by many.

Although, Gopakumar's acting prowess did not go unnoticed by Adoor Gopalakrishnan when he happened to watch a stage play that Gopakumar took part in. Adoor Gopalakrishnan called Gopakumar again in 1993, this time to play the title role in Vidheyan, an adaptation of the novel Bhaskara Pattelarum Ente Jeevithavum by Paul Zacharia. This turned out to be the big break that Gopakumar was looking for in his career. His performance in Vidheyan earned him a Kerala State Film Award – Special Jury Award.

In 1999, he won Kerala State Film Award for Second Best Actor for his role in Gopalan Nairude Thaadi.

Personal life
Gopakumar has been married to L. Indira Devi since 1975. The couple has a daughter – Soumya, and a son - Sreejith.

In the media
In 1996, when Hollywood director Steven Spielberg was looking for an Indian actor to play a role in The Lost World: Jurassic Park, his casting agents in India were directed towards M. R. Gopakumar by Adoor Gopalakrishnan himself. After multiple rounds of discussions and reviews of acting clips, Gopakumar was selected to play the role of the Indian character. The news attracted national attention almost immediately, as Gopakumar was set to become the first Indian actor to act in a Steven Spielberg film. However, Gopakumar was unable to join the production unit in Los Angeles as his work permit could not be processed within time. The role in the movie was later played by a foreign actor.

Filmography
Gopakumar has acted in more than 50 feature films and around 100 tele-films and television serials. He is still active in both professional and amateur plays.

Films

 Kurup (2021)
 Kuppivala (2017)
 Pulimurugan (2016)
 Mallanum Mathevanum (2014) Unreleased film
 Chaayilyam (2014)
 Thekku Thekkoru Deshathu
 Kattum Mazhayum
 White Paper
 Snehikkan Oru Manassu
 Nirnnayakam (2015)
 Chewing Gum (2013)
 Pigman (2013).... Madhavan
 Manikkya Thamburattiyum Christmas Karolum (2013)
 My Fan Ramu (2013)
 Ozhimuri (2012)
 Karmayogi (2012)
 The Last Vision (2012)
 Puthiya Theerangal (2012)
 Adaminte Makan Abu (2011)
 Ee Dhanya Muhoortham (2011)
 Priyappetta Nattukkare (2011)
 Punyam Aham (2010)
 The Thriller(2010)....Adv. Uthaman Pillai
 Thathwamasi (2009)
 Oru Pennum Randaanum (2008)
 De Ingottu Nokkiye (2008)
 Madampi (2008)....Kottilakathu Raghavan
 Malabar Wedding (2008)
 Vilapangalkkappuram (2008)
 Naalu Pennungal  (2007)
 Shyaamam (2006)
 Ammathottil (2006)
 Mahha Samudram (2006)
 Out of Syllabus (2006)
 Nerariyan CBI (2005)....Mythili's father
 Udayon (2005) .... Chackochi
 Nottam (2006)
 Paadam Onnu: Oru Vilapam (2003)
 Mazhanoolkkanavu (2003)
 Bheri (2002)
 The Gift of God (2001)
 Jeevan Masai (2001)
 Neythukaran  (2001)
 Mookkuthi (2001)
 Mazhanoolkkanavu (2000)
 Thottam (2000)
 Susanna (2000)
 Neelathadaakatthile Nizhalppakshikal (2000)
 Devadasi (1999)
 Gaandhiyan (1999)
 Gopalan Nairude Thaadi (1999)
 Manthrikumaran (1998) as Ravunni
 Snehadoothu (1997)
 Bhoothakkannadi (1997)
 Kalyaanakkacheri (1997)
 Oru Neenda Yathra (1996)
 Vidheyan (1994) as Thommi
 Galileo (1994)
 Naaraayam (1993)
 Ardram (1992)
 Mathilukal (1990)

Television

Awards
Kerala State Film Awards
 1993: Special Jury Award for Acting – Vidheyan
 1999: Second Best Actor – Gopalan Nairude Thaadi

Kerala State Television Awards
 1994: Best Actor – Koodaaram
 1998: Best Actor – Pattolapponnu
 1999: Best Actor – Pulari, Baalyakaala Smaranakal
 2004: Best Supporting Actor – Fiction
 2008: Second Best Actor – Aranaazhika Neram

Asianet Television Awards
2019: Best actor in a character role - Neelakkuyil (TV series)

References

External links
 
 M R Gopakumar at MSI
Metromatinee
Malayala Chalachithram

Indian male film actors
Kerala State Film Award winners
Male actors from Tamil Nadu
Male actors in Malayalam cinema
Living people
1951 births
People from Kanyakumari district
Indian male television actors
Male actors in Malayalam television
20th-century Indian male actors
21st-century Indian male actors
Kerala State Television Award winners